The International Biscuit Festival is an annual festival held in Knoxville, Tennessee to celebrate the biscuit. The first festival was held on June 4–5, 2010, attracting over 5,000 attendees. The 2011 event was held Memorial Day weekend, with attendance estimated at between 15,000 and 20,000.

The event consists of a number of biscuit-related activities, special meals and entertainment. The activities include a buffet breakfast featuring a variety of biscuits created by East Tennessee restaurants and caterers, a vendor area with businesses selling biscuit-compatible foods, kitchen ware, cookbooks, and artwork, a tasting area with participating restaurants offering samples of signature biscuits, a live baking competition in multiple biscuit categories, a fine dining event presented by Blackberry Farm, and a tongue in cheek pageant with contestants demonstrating poise, fashion and talent.

In 2011, the event added a charitable component to benefit Share Our Strength and Second Harvest.

IBF went on hiatus in 2018.

References

External links 
 
"Miss Biscuit" podcast, from Tanner Latham's Authentic South

Food and drink festivals in the United States
Culture of Knoxville, Tennessee
Tourist attractions in Knoxville, Tennessee
Festivals in Tennessee